Tobias Carl Peter Borg (born 2 November 1993) is a Swedish professional basketball player for MoraBanc Andorra of the LEB Oro.

Professional career
Borg began his professional career with Talje BK, during the 2009–10 season. In 2010, he moved to Södertälje Kings and he won two leagues. In 2014, he signed a one-year contract with Bilbao Basket. In 2015, he signed a new two-year contract extension with Bilbao Basket.

On February 1, 2018, Borg signed with Iberostar Tenerife of the Liga ACB. On August 14, 2018, Borg signed a two-year deal with Real Betis Energía Plus of the LEB Oro.

On September 9, 2021, he has signed with Lenovo Tenerife of the Liga ACB.

Awards and accomplishments

Pro career
Basketligan champion: (2012–13, 2013–14)

References

External links
 Tobias Borg at acb.com
 Tobias Borg at eurobasket.com
 

1993 births
Living people
Bilbao Basket players
CB Canarias players
Liga ACB players
Real Betis Baloncesto players
Shooting guards
Södertälje Kings players
Swedish expatriate basketball people in Spain
Swedish men's basketball players
People from Södertälje
Sportspeople from Stockholm County
21st-century Swedish people